Dichomeris microphanta is a moth in the family Gelechiidae. It was described by Edward Meyrick in 1921. It is found in Zimbabwe.

The forewings are dark purplish fuscous with small undefined opposite spots of whitish-ochreous suffusion on the costa at three-fourths and the dorsum before the tornus, and three or four scattered scales between them. The hindwings are rather dark grey.

References

Endemic fauna of Zimbabwe
Moths described in 1921
microphanta